Bernard John Shapero (born August 1963) is a British dealer in antiquarian rare books and works on paper, the founder of Shapero Rare Books of 106 New Bond Street, Mayfair, London. In 2005, Slate called him "London's most successful rare-book dealer and arguably the top dealer in the world today".

Early life
Bernard John Shapero was born in August 1963, and started dealing in books in the late 1970s, while still a pupil at Highgate School. His father was a collector of armour and gold coins.

Career
In October 2005, Shapero purchased the Doria Atlas for £1.46 million, the highest price ever paid for an atlas, although this record was surpassed by the Cosmographia the following year.
In April 2004, the atlas had been saved from a fire at Wardington Manor in Oxfordshire, when local residents formed a human chain to remove items from the library.

Shapero Rare Books owned about 6,000 books, ranging in price from £50 to over £200,000, and £6,000 on average. The business was sold by Shapero to Philip Blackwell, a director of the family business Blackwell Publishing, which had been sold to the US John Wiley & Sons in 2007 for £572 million to become Wiley-Blackwell.

In 2012, Shapero bought Dutch businessman Joost Ritman's collection of 300 old religious books and 60 manuscripts for €9.5million, with finance coming from a Ukrainian oligarch.

Personal life
Shapero lives in Hampstead, London, in a house which is half Victorian and half an "ultra-modern" extension, with his wife Emma Lewis, and their three children.

References

Living people
1963 births
People from Hampstead
People educated at Highgate School
Antiquarian booksellers
British booksellers